Jyoti Dutta (26 April 1926 – 7 January 2010) was an Indian cricketer. He played two first-class matches for Bengal in 1958/59.

See also
 List of Bengal cricketers

References

External links
 

1926 births
2010 deaths
Indian cricketers
Bengal cricketers
Cricketers from Kolkata